A flat-four engine, also known as a horizontally opposed-four engine, is a four-cylinder piston engine with two banks of cylinders lying on opposite sides of a common crankshaft. The most common type of flat-four engine is the boxer-four engine, each pair of opposed pistons moves inwards and outwards at the same time.

A boxer-four engine has perfect primary and secondary balance, however, the two cylinder heads means the design is more expensive to produce than an inline-four engine. There is a minor, secondary unbalanced rotational torque pulse in the plane of the pistons, when a piston pair at one end of the engine is at TDC and the other pair at BDC. The TDC pair creates a torque greater than the BDC pair, so the net unbalanced torque pulse is the difference. The difference in TDC vs BDC inertial forces is explained in the Engine balance section. Boxer-four engines have been used in cars since 1897, especially by Volkswagen and Subaru. They have also occasionally been used in motorcycles and frequently in aircraft.  Cessna and Piper use flat four engines from Lycoming and Continental in the most common civil aircraft in the world - the Cessna 172, and Piper Cherokee, while many ultralight and LSA planes use versions of the Rotax 912.

Design 

Most flat-four engines are designed so that each pair of opposing pistons moves inwards and outwards at the same time, which is known as a "boxer" configuration (somewhat like boxing competitors punching their gloves together before a fight). Therefore, the terms "flat-four" and "boxer-four" are often used synonymously.

The advantages of the boxer-four layout are perfect secondary vibration (resulting in minimal vibration), a low centre of gravity, and a short engine length. The layout also lends itself to efficient air cooling with the airflow being evenly distributed across the four cylinders.  In aircraft, this avoids the need to carry heavy water cooling systems.

The downsides of boxer-four engines (compared with inline-four engines) are their extra width, the increased costs associated with having two cylinder heads instead of one, and the long exhaust manifold required to achieve evenly spaced exhaust pulses. Due to these factors, inline-four engines are more commonly used than flat-four engines, and V6 engines are often used where larger displacements are required.

Engine balance 
The equal and opposing forces generated in a boxer-four engine result in perfect secondary balance (unlike the unbalanced vertical forces produced by inline-four engines). Boxer-four engines are therefore better suited to displacements above , since they do not require balance shafts to reduce the secondary vibration.

In practice, each cylinder in a boxer engine is slightly offset from its opposing pair due to the distance between the crankpins along the crankshaft. This offset distance means that the equal and opposite forces from each cylinder pair produces a rocking couple. The resulting vibration is not usually high enough to require balance shafts.

As per all four-stroke engines with four cylinder or less, the lack of overlap in the power strokes results in a pulsating delivery of torque to the flywheel, causing a torsional vibration along the crankshaft axis. If necessary, this vibration can be minimised using a harmonic damper.

Exhaust manifold 
The typical firing order for a boxer-four engine is for the left bank of cylinders to ignite one after another, followed by the right bank of cylinders (or vice versa), with the firing interval evenly spaced at 180 degrees. Traditionally, the exhausts from the two cylinders on each bank were merged, with the resulting uneven exhaust pulses causing a characteristic "flat-four burble" exhaust sound.

The other common exhaust configuration (such as used by Subaru since the mid-2000s) is to pair the cylinders with a firing interval offset of 360 degrees, in order to optimise the exhaust pulses. This configuration requires long exhaust manifolds, in order to pair the cylinders on opposite banks, and results in a less distinctive exhaust sound.

Use in automobiles

1900–1935 

In 1900, the first flat-four engine was produced by Benz & Cie, based on Benz's  1897 "contra" flat-twin engine.

London company Wilson-Pilcher released its first car in 1901, which was powered by a flat-four engine. Unusually for its day, the bore and stroke were equal, with each being .

In 1902 the Buffum automobile was equipped with opposed four cylinder engines that were rated at 16 horsepower. Herbert H. Buffum produced an American Automobile called the Buffum in Abington, Massachusetts from 1903 to 1907.

Having previously produced flat-twin engines, the 1926 Tatra 30 was the Czech company's first model powered by a flat-four engine. Tatra produced various flat-four engined model through the 1920s and 1930s.

1936–1999 

The 1936 Tatra T97 pioneered the rear-engined, air-cooled flat-four, backbone chassis layout (later used by the Volkswagen Beetle), and at the same time, though unrelated, came the Steyr 50 from Austria, sporting a front boxer 4 engine with rear wheel drive. Also in 1936, English company Jowett expanded its model range from flat-twin engines to also include flat-four engines. Production of Jowett flat-four engines continued until 1954, when the Jowett Javelin saloon and Jowett Jupiter sports models ended production.

The longest production flat-four engine is the Volkswagen air-cooled engine, which was produced from 1938 until 2006 and was most famously used in the rear-engined 1938–2003 Volkswagen Beetle and 1950–2005 Volkswagen Transporter. This air-cooled engine was designed by Porsche and was also used in the 1948–1965 Porsche 356, 1953–1956 Porsche 550, 1965–1969 Porsche 912 and 1969–1976 Porsche 914. In 1982, to comply with exhaust emissions regulations a water-cooled version called the Volkswagen Wasserboxer was introduced in the Volkswagen Transporter (T3)

During the 1960s and 1970s, several manufacturers produced flat-four engines including the air-cooled Citroën flat-four engine, the water-cooled Alfa Romeo flat-four engine, the water-cooled Lancia flat-four engine and the water-cooled Subaru EA engine.

Two important engines designed during this period, but never saw the light of day in series production, were the Morris 800cc side valve engine by Alec Issigonis in 1947 originally destined for the Morris Minor, and the Ferguson 2.2 litre SOHC engine by Claude Hill in 1966 as part of the R5 vehicle research project.

2000–present

By 2000, most manufacturers had replaced flat-four engines with inline-four engines. A notable exception is Subaru, with the water-cooled Subaru EJ engine being available in turbocharged form in the Subaru WRX sports sedan and its World Rally Car counterpart. Subaru's adoption of all-wheel drive was a factor in retaining the flat-four engine, since the shorter length of this engine assists in fitting the all-wheel drive components into the chassis.  Although it is more expensive than an inline-four engine, the flat-four engine allows Subaru to build an all-wheel drive vehicle at little extra cost from two-wheel drive.

In 2012, a naturally aspirated version of the Subaru FA engine was used in the Toyota 86 (also called the "Subaru BRZ" and "Scion FR-S") rear-wheel drive sports coupe.

The 2016 Porsche Boxster/Cayman (982) mid-engined sports cars downsized from a naturally aspirated flat-six engine to a turbocharged flat-four engine, Porsche's first flat-four since the mid-1970s. Several reviewers criticised the Boxster/Cayman for an uninspiring engine sound.

Use in motorcycles 

Most motorcycles with four-cylinder engines use an inline-four engine layout, however, several flat-four engine engines have been used in shaft drive motorcycles:
 1938–1939 Zündapp K800 (air-cooled)
 1974–1987 Honda Gold Wing (liquid-cooled)
 1955–1956 Wooler 500cc (air-cooled)
 1981–1982 BFG 1300, using the air-cooled Citroën flat-four car engine. Approximately 450 were built, with one quarter of these purchased by the French police.

Use in aircraft 

See also 
 Inline-four engine
 V4 engine

References 

04
Flat-04